Nizigama is a surname. Notable people with the surname include:

Aloÿs Nizigama (born 1966), Burundian long-distance runner
Gabriel Nizigama, Burundian politician
Lucie Nizigama (1957–2010), Burundian legal scholar and activist

Surnames of African origin